Pradnya Gadre (born 17 October 1990) is an Indian badminton player from Nashik, Maharashtra who currently plays doubles and mixed doubles. She partners Ashwini Ponnappa for women's doubles events.
The other partners she earlier paired up for women's doubles are Jyotshna P, Prajakta Sawant, Nitya Sosale. She is married to Indian badminton player Pranav Chopra.
For mixed doubles Events she partners with Akshay Dewalkar, earlier it was Pranaav Jerry Chopra. She is sponsored by Flypower-arbi sports.

Achievements

BWF International Challenge/Series (7 titles, 2 runners-up) 
Women's doubles

Mixed doubles

 International Challenge tournament
 International Series tournament

See also
Ashwini Ponnappa

References

External links
 

Indian female badminton players
Indian national badminton champions
Living people
1990 births
Asian Games medalists in badminton
Badminton players at the 2014 Asian Games
Sportswomen from Hyderabad, India

Asian Games bronze medalists for India
21st-century Indian women
21st-century Indian people
People from Nashik
Sportswomen from Maharashtra
Medalists at the 2014 Asian Games
Racket sportspeople from Hyderabad, India